= BLOCO =

Student wing of the Greek SYRIZA party

BLOCO - Network of the Radical Left Schemes (Greek: BLOCO - Δίκτυο Σχημάτων Ριζοσπαστικής Αριστεράς) has been the student wing of the SYRIZA Greek political party since 2015. It was established after the United Independent Left Movement - Left Unity (Greek: Ενιαία Ανεξάρτητη Αριστερή Κίνηση - Αριστερή Ενότητα) student wing chose to distance itself from SYRIZA. BLOCO's performance in university elections has been relatively modest. In the 2024 elections, its cummulative percentage nationwide was below 1%.
